Blood Oath, known in some countries as Prisoners of the Sun, is a 1990 Australian drama film directed by Stephen Wallace and co-written by Denis Whitburn and Brian A. Williams. The film stars Bryan Brown, George Takei, Terry O'Quinn, John Bach, John Clarke, Deborah Kara Unger, John Polson, Nicholas Eadie, David Argue and Ray Barrett. The film is based on the real-life trial of Japanese soldiers for war crimes committed against Allied prisoners of war on the island of Ambon, in the Netherlands East Indies (Indonesia), such as the Laha massacre of 1942.

The film was the first film debut for both Russell Crowe and Jason Donovan, in minor roles. It was nominated for several AFI Awards in 1990, including "Best Film". It won the AFI Awards for "Best Achievement in Sound" and "Best Achievement in Costume Design".

Cast
Bryan Brown as Captain Cooper
George Takei as Vice-Admiral Baron Takahashi
Terry O'Quinn as Major Beckett
John Bach as Major Roberts
Sokyu Fujita as Mr. Matsugae
John Clarke as Sheedy
Deborah Unger as Sister Littell
John Polson as Private Jimmy Fenton
Russell Crowe as Lt. Corbett
Nicholas Eadie as Sgt. Keenan
Jason Donovan as Private Talbot
Toshi Shioya as Lt. Tanaka
Ray Barrett as President of the Bench
Kevin Paul Weeks as the Cook

Production
The film was the idea of Brian Williams, who was the son of Captain John Williams, who had prosecuted Japanese officers in charge of the POW camp at Ambon during the war. He was impressed with the TV series The Last Bastion and approached Denis Whitburn, who had written it with David Williamson, and they wrote the script and produced together. Bryan Brown and Stephen Wallace then came on board the project (although at one point Geoff Murphy was also considered as director).

The movie was shot at the Village-Warner Film Studio on the Gold Coast.

Box office
Blood Oath opened on 60 screens in Australia and grossed A$310,281 in its opening week finishing fourth place at the box office and went on to gross A$707,194 at the box office in Australia. Stephen Wallace has said he thought the film would have been better had the writers been more accurate as the truth was more interesting.

The writers announced plans to follow up Blood Oath with a $20 million film about the Cowra breakout, Giants at Dawn, but this was not made.

See also
Dutch East Indies campaign
Japanese war crimes
Cinema of Australia

References

External links

 Blood Oath at the National Film and Sound Archive
Blood Oath at Oz Movies

1990 films
1990 drama films
Australian drama films
1990s Japanese-language films
World War II war crimes trials films
1990s legal films
Pacific War films
Films set in Indonesia
Films directed by Stephen Wallace
World War II prisoner of war films
1990s English-language films
Films about capital punishment